Adrian Adgar (born 1965) is a retired cyclist who competed for England.

Cycling career
Adgar finished runner-up in the 1987 British National Madison Championships with Paul Wain. He represented England in the 10 miles scratch race event, at the 1986 Commonwealth Games in Edinburgh, Scotland.
Adrian Adgar won a bronze medal in the 4,000 metres team pursuit event, with Chris Boardman, Gary Coltman,and Jon Walshaw, at the 1986 Commonwealth Games in Edinburgh, Scotland.[1][2]

References

English male cyclists
1965 births
Cyclists at the 1986 Commonwealth Games
Living people
Commonwealth Games competitors for England